Too Many Crooks is a 1930 British comedy crime film directed by George King and starring Laurence Olivier, Dorothy Boyd and Arthur Stratton.

It was shot at Twickenham Studios as a quota quickie for distribution by Fox Film. The film is currently missing from the BFI National Archive, and is listed as one of the British Film Institute's "75 Most Wanted" lost films.

Premise
A man tries to burgle his own safe on the same night that a professional criminal attempts it.

Cast
Laurence Olivier as The Boy 	
Dorothy Boyd as The Girl 	
A. Bromley Davenport as The Man Upstairs 	
Mina Burnett as The Maid Downstairs  
 Arthur Stratton as The Burglar
Ellen Pollock as The Other Girl

References

Bibliography
 Chibnall, Steve. Quota Quickies: The Birth of the British 'B' Film. British Film Institute, 2007.
 Low, Rachael. Filmmaking in 1930s Britain. George Allen & Unwin, 1985.
 Wood, Linda. British Films, 1927-1939. British Film Institute, 1986.

External links 

1930 films
1930s crime comedy films
Lost British films
British crime comedy films
British black-and-white films
1930 lost films
Lost crime comedy films
1930 comedy films
Films shot at Twickenham Film Studios
Quota quickies
Fox Film films
1930s English-language films
1930s American films
1930s British films